Rhopalocarpus randrianaivoi is a tree in the family Sphaerosepalaceae. It is endemic to Madagascar. It is named for the authors' colleague and specimen collector Richard Randrianaivo.

Description
The species is not known to have any flowers. The fleshy fruits are coloured brown.

Distribution and habitat
Rhopalocarpus randrianaivoi is known only from a few locations in the northeastern region of Sava. Its habitat is humid or subhumid evergreen forests from sea-level to  altitude.

Threats
Rhopalocarpus randrianaivoi is threatened by shifting patterns of agriculture which are causing deforestation. The species is not present in any protected areas.

References

randrianaivoi
Endemic flora of Madagascar
Trees of Madagascar
Plants described in 2006